Vietnamese cuisine includes many types of noodles. They come in different colors and textures and can be served wet or dry, hot or cold, and fresh (tươi), dried (khô), or fried.

Types of noodles
Vietnamese noodles are available in either fresh (tươi) or dried (khô) form.

 Cellophane noodles (most commonly called miến, more rarely bún tàu, or bún tào) - thin glass noodle made from dzong (canna) starch. Slightly chewy, thin, and cylindrical
 Rice noodles
 Bánh canh - thick noodles made from a mixture of rice flour and tapioca flour or wheat flour; similar in appearance, but not in substance, to udon
 Bánh canh bột lọc - made from tapioca flour
 Bánh canh Trảng Bàng - made from rice flour
 Bánh cuốn and Bánh ướt - sheets of broad rice noodles
 Bánh đa - white or red noodles used in Bánh đa cua - rice noodle soup with crab, a specialty of Hải Phòng
 Bánh gật gù - Very thick rice cake from Quảng Ninh
 Bánh phở - flat rice noodles; these are available in a wide variety of widths and may be used for either phở soup or stir-fried dishes
 Bánh tằm - thick, short rice noodles from Bạc Liêu
 Cháo canh - similar to bánh canh, popular in North-Central region
 Hủ tiếu - A version of kuay teow that became popular in the 1960s in Southern Vietnam, especially in Saigon. There are different types of noodles for Hủ tiếu, such as hủ tiếu dai (chewy tapioca noodles) - the most popular version, hủ tiếu mềm (soft rice noodles) or hủ tiếu trứng cuộn (rolled egg noodles).
 Rice vermicelli
 Bánh hỏi - very thin rice vermicelli made into sheets
 Bún - thin white round noodles (often called rice vermicelli) steamed in leaves and offer a hint of sourness
 Bún lá - used in Bún lá cá dầm Ninh Hoà
 Bún gạo
 Mì - egg or wheat flour noodles. The noodles are often mixed with egg yolk and give it a yellow color
 Hoành thánh - similar to Chinese wonton
 Nui - from French nouille, a Vietnamese version of macaroni

Noodle dishes

From Bún
Bún bò Huế - signature noodle soup from Huế, consisting of rice vermicelli in a beef broth with beef, lemon grass, and other ingredients
Bún bò Nam Bộ - stir-fried bún with beef, roasted peanut, herbs and sauce
Bún bung - soup made with tomato, Alocasia odora, green papaya, tamarind, green onions and pork.
Bún chả - rice vermicelli with grilled pork meatballs served over salad, herbs, bean sprouts, and sliced cucumbers
Bún chả cá - rice vermicelli soup with fried fishcake
Bún chạo tôm - Shrimp skewered on grilled sugarcane stick served with rice vermicelli and raw vegetables
Bún đậu mắm tôm - Pressed vermicelli noodles with fried tofu served with shrimp paste
Bún mắm - rice vermicelli noodle soup with a heavy shrimp paste broth
Bún măng vịt - rice vermicelli soup with duck meat cooked with fresh bamboo shoots or sour bamboo shoots
Bún mọc
Bún nước lèo - famous for Bún nước lèo Trà Vinh and Bún nước lèo Sóc Trăng. In addition to the special broth, there are also pork blood, minced snakehead fish, roasted pork and various bean sprouts, but indispensable raw bean sprouts, thinly sliced bananas and chives
Bún ốc - tomato and snail based noodle soup topped with scallions
Bún riêu - rice vermicelli soup with meat, tofu, tomatoes, and congealed boiled pig blood
Bún riêu cua - with crab
Bún riêu cá - with fish
Bún riêu ốc - with snails
 Bún sứa - noodles with jellyfish
Bún thang - soup made with shredded chicken meat, shredded fried egg, shredded steam pork cake, and various vegetables
Bún thịt nướng - a cold noodle dish consisting of bún with grilled pork

From Bánh canh 

 Bánh canh Trảng Bàng
Bánh canh cua

From Bánh đa 

 Bánh đa cua

From Bánh phở
Phở - bánh phở in a broth made from beef and spices
Phở trộn - bánh phở mixed with sauce
Phở xào - stir-fried bánh phở
Phở cuốn - translated as either "Phở roll"; bánh phở not sliced, large and rolled with a variety of meats and vegetables, dipped in sweet and sour fish sauce. Phở cuốn, as an innovation of traditional Phở, is very popular in Hanoi.

From Bánh tằm 

 Bánh tằm bì
 Bánh tằm cà ri - Special rice noodles served with spicy chicken curry

From Hủ tiếu
Hủ tiếu Nam Vang
Hủ tiếu Mỹ Tho
Hủ tiếu Sa Đéc
Hủ tiếu gõ
Hủ tiếu khô - bánh hủ tiếu noodles mixed with sauce
Hủ tiếu xào - stir-fried bánh hủ tiếu

From Mì 
Cao lầu - signature noodle dish from Hội An consisting of yellow wheat flour noodles in a small amount of broth, with various meats and herbs.
Mì Quảng - signature noodle dish from Quảng Nam, yellow wheat flour noodles in a small amount of broth, with various meats and herbs.
Mì xào - stir-fried noodles with eggs, meat, vegetables, seafood...

From Miến 

 Miến lươn - made from noodles with eel meat, there are two forms: dried eel noodles and eel noodles cooked in bone broth.
 Miến trộn - stir-fried or blanched miến, mixed with shrimp or crab, seasoned with sweet and spicy spices

Rolls and rice papers
Bánh cuốn and Bánh ướt - sheet of rice flour filled with spiced minced pork and mushroom

See also

 List of noodles
 List of noodle dishes
 List of Vietnamese culinary specialities
 List of Vietnamese dishes
 List of Vietnamese ingredients

References

 
Street food